This is an episode list for the 1995 TV series, Tenchi Universe (Tenchi Muyo! in Japan). Tenchi Universe is an alternate re-telling of the original seasons of Tenchi Muyo! Ryo-Ohki. It is produced by AIC and Pioneer LDC. The 26-episode series aired on TV Tokyo from April 2, 1995 to September 24, 1995. In the US, the show aired on Cartoon Network's Toonami block from July 20, 2000 to August 24, 2000. The series is split into three arcs.

Episodes

Earth Adventure ["Chikyū-hen" (地球篇)] (Episodes 1-10)

{|class="wikitable" width="98%"
|- style="border-bottom: 3px solid #CCF"
! width="30" | # !! Title !! width="150" | Original airdate !! US airdate
|-

|}

Time and Space Adventures ["Tokubetsu Kōgyō" (特別興行)] (Episodes 11-13)
These episodes are an adaptation of the drama CD, Tenchi Muyo! Special: Creation of the Universe Journey across Space-Time, with the exception of Ayeka's and Kiyone's tales, which were created for episodes 11 and 12 respectively. The former tale was supposed to be on the aforementioned CD, but was cut out due to time constraints.

{|class="wikitable" width="98%"
|- style="border-bottom: 3px solid #CCF"
! width="30" | # !! Title !! width="150" | Original airdate !! US airdate
|-

|}

Space Adventure ["Uchū-hen" (宇宙篇)] (Episodes 14-26)
{|class="wikitable" width="98%"
|- style="border-bottom: 3px solid #CCF"
! width="30" | # !! Title !! width="150" | Original airdate !! US airdate
|-

|}

Home Media
It was licensed in the US by Geneon Entertainment in 1996 who brought the show onto Laserdisc, VHS and DVD, before shutting down in September 2007.  In 2010, Funimation Entertainment announced the licenses of a handful of Geneon titles including Tenchi Universe.  An official boxset was released on October 16, 2012.

References 

1995 Japanese television seasons
Universe